Sara Bergmark Elfgren (born 1980) is a Swedish writer and screenwriter. Her first novel, Cirkeln (The Circle), and the sequels Eld (Fire) and Nyckeln (The Key) (known collectively as the Engelsfors trilogy), were written together with Mats Strandberg and published in 2011 - 2013. Cirkeln was an August Prize nominee in the youth literature category. The books have been translated into 25 languages.

In 2016, Bergmark Elfgren created and wrote the radio mockumentary thriller De dödas röster (Voices of the Dead) which received favourable reviews. It was nominated to Prix Europa.

Her novel Norra Latin was published in 2017. It is a supernatural young adult novel set at the Norra Latin secondary school in Stockholm; in the novel, the school was never closed, and it houses a theatre programme where the story's main characters are students.

Together with artist Karl Johnsson she created the graphic novel Vei - book 1, which was published in 2017, an epic fantasy story inspired by Norse Mythology.

Bibliography 
 Cirkeln (2011) (with Mats Strandberg)
 Eld (2012) (with Mats Strandberg)
 Nyckeln (2013) (with Mats Strandberg)
 Norra Latin (2017)
 Vei - book 1 (with Karl Johnsson)
 Vei - book 2 (with Karl Johnsson)
 Grim (2021)

References

External links

1980 births
Living people
Swedish fantasy writers
Swedish screenwriters
Swedish writers of young adult literature
Swedish women screenwriters
Women writers of young adult literature
Women science fiction and fantasy writers